Cole Seiler (born February 5, 1994) is an American former soccer player.

Career

College career
Seiler played four years of college soccer at Georgetown University between 2012 and 2015, where he helped the Hoyas win a Big East Conference regular season title as well as the Big East Tournament championship.

While at college, Seiler played with Premier Development League sides Orlando City U-23 and Baltimore Bohemians.

Professional
On January 14, 2016 Seiler was selected by Vancouver Whitecaps FC in the 2016 MLS SuperDraft as the 16th pick. He officially signed with the club on February 8, 2016. He made his first team debut on June 1 during the 2016 Canadian Championship.

Seiler signed with USL side Sacramento Republic FC on January 25, 2018 for the 2018 season.

On February 4, 2019, Seiler returned to his native South Carolina, signing with Greenville Triumph SC in USL League One.

On February 11, 2020, Seiler announced his retirement from professional soccer.

References

External links 
 

1994 births
Living people
American soccer players
Association football defenders
Baltimore Bohemians players
Georgetown Hoyas men's soccer players
Major League Soccer players
Orlando City U-23 players
People from Anderson, South Carolina
Sacramento Republic FC players
Soccer players from South Carolina
USL Championship players
USL League Two players
Vancouver Whitecaps FC draft picks
Vancouver Whitecaps FC players
Whitecaps FC 2 players
USL League One players